Paraciura perpicillaris is a species of tephritid or fruit flies in the genus Paraciura of the family Tephritidae.

Distribution
Ghana, Ethiopia, Congo, Uganda, Kenya, Madagascar.

References

Tephritinae
Insects described in 1920
Taxa named by Mario Bezzi
Diptera of Africa